Leptodactylus tapiti is a species of frog in the family Leptodactylidae.
It is endemic to Brazil.
Its natural habitats are moist savanna, subtropical or tropical high-altitude grassland, and rivers.

References

tapiti
Endemic fauna of Brazil
Amphibians described in 1978
Taxonomy articles created by Polbot